is a Japanese animation studio founded in 2007 by former staff from Sunrise.

History
Bridge was founded by members of Sunrise's 6th studio while producing Sgt. Frog.

Works

Television series

OVA/ONA

References

External links
  
 

 
Japanese companies established in 2007
Animation studios in Tokyo
Japanese animation studios
Mass media companies established in 2007
Suginami